Dorothy Eugenia Miner (November 4, 1904 – May 12, 1973) was an American art historian, curator, and librarian who was a scholar of medieval art. Miner served as the first Keeper of Manuscripts at the Walters Art Museum from 1934 to 1973.

Career
Miner was born to Roy Waldo, who was Curator of Marine Life at the American Museum of Natural History, and Anna Elizabeth Carroll. Miner was of British and Irish descent from her father's and mother's side, respectively. She was a fraternal twin with her brother, Dwight C. Miner, who became a history professor at Columbia University. Born in New York City, she graduated from the local Horace Mann School in 1922. Miner then received a Bachelor of Arts in English and Classics from Barnard College in 1926, was a member of Phi Beta Kappa, and became the first International Fellow, studying abroad at Bedford College of the University of London. Two years later, she began pursuing a Doctor of Philosophy in Art History at Columbia, under Meyer Schapiro, but never completed the program. In 1931, Miner was hired to teach the subject at Barnard.

In 1933, the Morgan Library & Museum hired Miner to assist with the cataloging of the first exhibition in the United States devoted to illuminated manuscripts. In 1934, upon the recommendation of Morgan Library director Belle da Costa Greene, Miner became the first Keeper of Manuscripts at the Walters Art Museum, and eventually held the simultaneous position of Curator of Islamic and Near Eastern Art until her death from cancer in 1973.

In 1981, Claire Richter Sherman published a retrospective on Miner's career. She was named an honorary member of the Society of Scribes & Illuminators.

References

References

External links
Dictionary of Art Historians profile

1904 births
1973 deaths
Fraternal twins
American people of British descent
American people of Irish descent
People from New York City
Horace Mann School alumni
Barnard College alumni
Columbia Graduate School of Arts and Sciences alumni
Barnard College faculty
20th-century American historians
20th-century American women
American women historians
American art historians
Fellows of the Society of Scribes and Illuminators
Deaths from cancer in Maryland
American women curators
American curators
American women librarians
American librarians